Stefan Kaiser may refer to:

 Stefan Kaiser (ski jumper), Austrian ski jumper
 Stefan Kaiser (sculptor), German sculptor
 Stefan Kaiser (volleyball), German volleyball player